The 1977 New Jersey State Senate election coincided with Brendan Byrne's re-election to a second term as Governor of New Jersey.

The election coincided with Governor Brendan Byrne's re-election over Senator Raymond Bateman. Byrne narrowly survived a primary election which eliminated seven incumbent Democratic Senators. Despite the intra-party division and early polls indicating Byrne was an underdog in the general election, Byrne survived and the Democrats preserved their large majority in the Senate, losing just one seat on aggregate.

Incumbents not running for re-election

Democratic
John A. Lynch Sr. (District 17)
Alexander J. Menza (District 20) (ran for U.S. Senator)
Raymond Garramone (District 39) (ran for Governor)

Republican
Alfred N. Beadleston (District 11)
Raymond Bateman (District 16) (ran for Governor)
Frank Davenport (District 35)

Summary of results by district

Gaines and losses
Two incumbent Democratic Senators were defeated for re-election:
 District 10: Herbert Buehler (D-Monmouth) lost to Republican Brian Kennedy, a former Assemblyman from Monmouth County.
 District 23: Stephen Wiley (D-Morris) lost to Republican John H. Dorsey, an Assemblyman from Monmouth County.

One Democratic Senator resigned from the Senate in 1977 after receiving a federal appointment; that seat was picked up by the Republicans:
 District 14: Anne Clark Martindell (D-Mercer) was appointed U.S. Ambassador to New Zealand; she was succeeded by Republican Walter E. Foran, an Assemblyman from Hunterdon County.

One incumbent Independent Senator was defeated for re-election, a Democratic pickup:
 District 30: Anthony Imperiale (I-Essex) was defeated by Frank E. Rodgers, the Mayor of Harrison.

Incumbents who lost primaries
Two incumbent Democratic Senators who were denied party support for another term ran in the General Election as Independent candidates and were defeated; Democrats held both of these seats:
 District 2: Joseph McGahn (D-Atlantic) lost to Democrat Steven P. Perskie, an Assemblyman from Atlantic County.
 District 21: Thomas Dunn (D-Union) lost to Democrat John Gregorio, an Assemblyman from Union County and the Mayor of Linden.

Five incumbent Democratic Senators were defeated in the June primary; Democrats held four of the seats, and Republicans picked up one seat:
 District 6: Alene Ammond (D-Camden) lost the Democratic Primary to Victor Pachter; Pachter lost the general election to Republican Lee Laskin, a former Assemblyman. 
 District 7: Edward J. Hughes (D-Burlington) lost the Democratic Primary to Charles B. Yates; Yates won the General Election.
 District 19: John Fay (D-Middlesex) lost the Democratic Primary to Laurence Weiss. Weiss won the General Election.
 District 31: James P. Dugan (D-Hudson) lost the Democratic Primary to Wally Sheil, the President of Hudson County Community College. 
 District 32: Joseph W. Tumulty (D-Hudson) lost the Democratic Primary to David Friedland, a former Assemblyman from Hudson County.

Key primary races
 District 6: Alene Ammond lost support of the Camden Democratic organization and Senate Democrats had tossed her out of their caucus.  Pachter, a former Cherry Hill Councilman, beat Ammond by just 533 votes (47%-43%).
 District 7: Assemblyman Charles B. Yates beat Senator Edward J. Hughes by just 352 votes (52%-49%). 
 District 19: Larry Weiss beat incumbent Jack Fay by 2,686 votes (54%-46%).  
 District 23: Assemblyman John H. Dorsey defeated former Assemblyman Albert Merck in the Republican Senate primary by a 62%-38% margin.  Merck was the heir to the Merck & Co. pharmaceutical fortune.
 Districts 31 & 32: Two incumbents were defeated by wide margins in the June Democratic Primary in the aftermath of the May election for Mayor of Jersey City.   James Dugan was the incumbent Democratic State Chairman, but Walter Sheil had the backing of Mayor-elect Thomas F.X. Smith.  Dugan finished third in a field of four candidates, more than 8,000 votes behind Sheil.  Friedland also had Smith's backing; Tumulty lost by almost 15,000 votes, 77%-23%.

Key general election races
 Republican Pickup in District 6:   With Democrats split after Ammond's primary loss, Republicans replaced the winner of the GOP primary, Addison Bradley, and replaced him with Laskin, who was a stronger General Election candidate.  Laskin won by 2,374 votes (52%-48%).
 Republican Pickup in District 23: Democrat Stephen B. Wiley, an unexpected '73 winner in heavily GOP Morris County, was not supposed to even run for re-election; Gov. Byrne had nominated him as an Associate Justice of the New Jersey Supreme Court, but he was unable to take the post because of a state law that prevented legislators from taking jobs for which they had voted to raise the pay.  
 Democratic Pickup in District 30: Incumbent Anthony Imperiale, elected as an Independent in 1973, lost to Democrat Frank E. Rodgers, the longtime Mayor of Harrison, 48%-35%.  Republican Harry J. Romeo ran third with 17%.
 Democratic Pickup in District 35: Republican Frank Davenport, who beat an incumbent Democrat in 1973 by just 93 votes, did not seek re-election.  Democrat Frank X. Graves, the Mayor of Paterson, defeated former Assemblyman Alfred Fontanella by a 56%-40% margin.
 Two incumbents, Thomas Dunn (the Mayor of Elizabeth) in Union County, and Joseph McGahn in Atlantic County, lost party support for re-election.  Rather than compete in Democratic primaries, both ran as Independents and lost.  In Atlantic, Assembly Majority Leader Steven P. Perskie defeated Republican Frederick Perrone by a 48%-30% margin, with McGahn finishing third with 22%.  In Union, Assemblyman John Gregorio (who was also the Mayor of Linden) defeated Dunn, 47%-32%, with Republican Robert T. Walsh finishing third with 19%.

District 1

District 2

District 3

District 4

District 5

District 6

District 7

District 8

District 9

District 10

District 11

District 12

District 13

District 14

District 15

District 16

District 17

District 18

District 19

District 20

District 21

District 22

District 23

District 24

District 25

District 26

District 27

District 28

District 29

District 30

District 31

District 32

District 33

District 34

District 35

District 36

District 37

District 38

District 39

District 40

Leadership
Democrats chose Joseph P. Merlino as the Senate President and Carmen Orechio as Majority Leader; Republicans named Garrett Hagedorn as Minority Leader.

References

1977 New Jersey elections
New Jersey
1977